Bernardo Martins Sousa (born 27 March 2000), sometimes known as Benny, is a Portuguese professional footballer who plays as a midfielder for Chaves.

Professional career
Sousa is a youth product of Porto, O Pinguinzinho, and Sporting CP. He began his senior career with Sporting CP B in 2020. After a couple of seasons with them, he moved to the Primeira Liga club Chaves on 27 January 2022. He made his professional and senior debut with Chaves in a 1–0 Primeira Liga loss to Vitória F.C. on 7 August 2022.

International career
Sousa is a youth international for Portugal, having played up to the Portugal U19s.

References

External links
 
 

2000 births
Living people
People from Santa Comba Dão
Portuguese footballers
Portugal youth international footballers
Sporting CP B players
G.D. Chaves players
Primeira Liga players
Campeonato de Portugal (league) players
Association football midfielders